Beckenham is a town in London, England.

Beckenham may also refer to:
Beckenham (UK Parliament constituency), a constituency represented in the House of Commons
Beckenham, Western Australia, a suburb of Perth, Western Australia 
Beckenham, New Zealand, a suburb of Christchurch, New Zealand
Municipal Borough of Beckenham, a local government in Kent, England from 1878 to 1965